Good Counsel College may refer to:

 Good Counsel College, Innisfail, Queensland, Australia
 St Augustine's and Good Counsel College, New Ross, County Wexford, Ireland